Wesling is a surname. Notable people with the surname include:

Kresse Wesling, British entrepreneur

See also
Westling